The Amityville Haunting is a 2011 direct-to-video horror film released on December 13, 2011. The film is inspired by the 1977 book The Amityville Horror. The film was produced by The Asylum and Taut Productions.

The film is written and directed by Geoff Meed and stars Tyler Shamy, Devin Clark, and Jon Kondelik, all of whom are uncredited. The tagline is "The family did not survive. But the recordings did." It claims to be based on "actual found footage that documents the horrifying experiences of a family that moved into the infamous haunted house." The film was panned by critics, and has been often cited as one of the worst horror films ever made.

Plot
In June 2008, the Benson family moves into 112 Ocean Avenue, Amityville, due to issues with their teenage daughter, Lori. Despite the disturbing history of the house where Ronald DeFeo Jr. shot and killed six family members in 1974, the Bensons agree to purchase the house. Upon their decision, they find their realtor dead in their driveway. The following day, Tyler Benson witnesses one of the movers falling down the stairs, killing him instantly. The family continues to live in the house, despite the tension growing from the unexplainable events occurring.

From doors opening to a mysterious phone appearing in the kitchen, paranormal phenomena continue to bother Tyler, while his parents refuse to believe anything is happening beyond their own explanation. Douglas Benson takes matters into his own hands when he decides to install CCTV cameras in the house. Young Melanie Benson attracts the family's attention when she starts talking to her "imaginary friend," John Matthew, which leads Douglas to wonder if Lori or Tyler told Melanie about the house's history.

As the family grows more fearful of the unexplainable deaths of a close family friend and a neighbor boy attracted to Lori, Douglas breaks down, using religious paraphernalia to rid the house of any spirits that reside within the house. After one month within the house, Lori, Virginia, Douglas, and Tyler Benson all die in various manners. Melanie Benson is the only survivor, as she says that she has plans to stay in the house forever, along with John Matthew. The autopsy reports shown at the end of the film emphasize the fact that each victim was under extreme stress at the time of their death.

Cast

Reception
The Amityville Haunting was panned by critics, and has been cited as one of the worst films made by The Asylum. A Horrornews.net writer called it "simply just a bad movie with no offering for viewers whatsoever", criticizing the over-used low-budget scare tricks and its false advertising as "Actual found footage". He also described Jason Williams' performance as Doug as "not believable for what it's trying to achieve and simply comes off as d*ck with an attitude", but said that "The military freak-out tops the icing by just making it all seem rather silly". Dread Central's Foywonder scored it a one out of five, concluding his review with "A part of me almost wonders if the only reason The Amityville Haunting even exists is because someone made a bet that they could dethrone Amityville 3D for the title of worst “Amityville” movie of all time. I don’t know if they succeeded here, but they sure give it a run for its money."

References

External links
 

2011 direct-to-video films
2011 directorial debut films
2011 films
2011 horror films
2011 independent films
2010s exploitation films
2010s ghost films
2010s police films
2010s psychological horror films
2010s supernatural horror films
American direct-to-video films
American exploitation films
American ghost films
American haunted house films
American independent films
American police detective films
American psychological horror films
American sequel films
American supernatural horror films
Amityville Horror films
Camcorder films
Direct-to-video horror films
Direct-to-video sequel films
Films about dysfunctional families
Films about imaginary friends
Films about mass murder
Films about post-traumatic stress disorder
Films about security and surveillance
Films set in 2008
Films set in Long Island
Films shot in Los Angeles
Found footage films
Juvenile delinquency in fiction
Mobile phone films
Patricide in fiction
Spontaneous human combustion in fiction
The Asylum films
Unofficial sequel films
2010s English-language films
2010s American films